Joe Leonard (August 4, 1932 in San Diego, California – April 27, 2017 in San Jose, California) was an American professional motorcycle racer and racecar driver.

Biography

Motorcycle career
Leonard won the first A.M.A. Grand National Championship Series in 1954 and won it again in 1956 and 1957. His record totals 27 wins, including the 1957 and 1958 Daytona 200. He also resulted vice-champion in 1958, 1960 and 1961, third in 1955, and fifth in 1959. He retired from motorcycle racing at the completion of the 1961 season and turned his attention to auto racing. He was also a member of the AMA (American Motorcycle Association District 36) Sanctioned San Jose Motorcycle club (The Dons) which includes such famed alumni as Sam Arena, Tom Sifton, Kenny Eggers and Sam Arena Jr.

USAC National Championship career

Early years
Leonard made his USAC National Championship debut during the 1964 season when he competed in five races for various teams. Leonard earned a best finish of 5th at the season-ending Bobby Ball Memorial at Phoenix International Raceway driving the #65 Travelon Trailer Christensen-Offenhauser. Leonard finished in 24th place in the standings.

Early success
In 1965, Leonard became teammates with Dan Gurney at Gurney's All American Racers team, driving the #29 All American Racers Hailbrand-Ford. During the season Leonard got his first win in the Milwaukee 150 at Wisconsin State Fairgrounds Park Speedway. Leonard also drove one race for legendary car builder and chief mechanic A. J. Watson at Leader Card Racing in the #2 Moog St. Louis Watson-Ford at the Langhorne 100 at Langhorne Speedway. At the end of the season Leonard finished 6th in the final point standings. In 1966, Leonard continued to race for AAR on the paved ovals and road courses in the #6 Yamaha Eagle-Ford (although he did drive the #29 All American Bardahl Hailbrand-Ford at the Jimmy Bryan Memorial at Phoenix International Raceway) and drove the #7 Vita Fresh Orange Juice Meskowski-Offenhauser at the dirt tracks (along with the Atlanta 300 at Atlanta Motor Speedway in the #11 Huffaker-Offenhauser. Leonard recorded a best finish of 3rd place three times en route to a 4th-place finish in points. Also, during the season at the Indianapolis 500 Leonard got his first top 10 in the historic race with a 9th-place finish.

In 1967, Leonard began the season for Sheraton-Thompson Racing in the #82 Sheraton-Thompson Racing Lotus-Ford and finished 4th at the season-opening Jimmy Bryan Memorial at Phoenix International Raceway. Starting at the Indianapolis 500 Leonard drove the #4 Sheraton-Thompson Racing Coyote-Ford. He qualified in 5th place and finished in 3rd place. Leonard changed cars again for the two races that made up the Telegraph Trophy 200 at Mosport Park where he drove the #4 Sheraton-Thompson Racing Eagle-Ford.

After that race, Leonard began to drive for Vel's Parnelli Jones Racing in the #20 Wagner Lockheed Brake Fluid Mongoose-Ford (also sponsored by Vel's Ford Sales at the Hanford 200 at Hanford Motor Speedway and the Rex Mays 300 at Riverside International Raceway). His best finish of the season wound up being at Indianapolis as he finished 9th in points.

Revolving teams
In 1968, Leonard started the season in the #9 Vel's Ford Sales Morris-Ford for Vel's Parnelli Jones Racing. Leonard finished in 3rd place at the Stardust 150 at Stardust International Raceway. This would end up being his best finish of the season. At the Indianapolis 500, Leonard drove for STP-Granatelli Racing. He first drove the #40 STP Oil Treatment Granatelli-Pratt & Whitney Canada PT6 but crashed that car in practice. As a result, drove the #60 STP Oil Treatment Lotus 56-Pratt & Whitney Canada PT6 in place of the injured Jackie Stewart. Leonard qualified on the pole position at a new track record speed of 171.599 mph. Leonard led the race for 31 laps, battling with Bobby Unser and Lloyd Ruby. He was the leader under a yellow flag with less than 10 laps to go, but when the race restarted on lap 191 Leonard's fuel shaft broke. His teammate Art Pollard, who had been running three laps behind at the time, had the same thing happen to him. Leonard coasted to a stop and finished in 12th place as Unser took the victory.

For the remainder of the season Leonard would usually qualify well, including a pole position at California 200 at Hanford Motor Speedway, but results weren't on his side as his best finish was only a 6th place at the second heat of the Telegraph Trophy 200 at Mosport Park. He finished 21st in points. Leonard was without a car to drive at the beginning of 1969 before legendary car builder Smokey Yunick hired him to drive his #44 City of Daytona Beach Eagle-Ford at the Indianapolis 500 where he finished in 6th place.

After Indianapolis, Leonard was without a car yet again. He first drove for Gene White in the #4 Wynn's SpitFire Mongoose-Offenhauser at the Trenton 200 at Trenton International Speedway where he finished in 19th place after suffering a broken oil line. He then briefly reunited with STP-Granatelli Racing in the #40 STP Oil Treartment Lotus-Offenhauser at the Tony Bettenhausen 200 at Wisconsin State Fairgrounds Park and the Delaware 200 at Dover Downs International Speedway. He qualified 3rd at Milwaukee but finishED 20th in that race and 21st at Dover. Leonard got one more driving gig that season at Vel's Parnelli Jones Racing in the #3 Vel's Parnelli Ford Lola-Ford for four races, getting a best finish of 5th at the Bobby Ball 150 at Phoenix International Raceway. He finished 21st in points.

Leonard returned to Vel's Parnelli Jones again in 1970, working with famed chief mechanic George Bignotti. In his first race of the year, the Indianapolis 500 he drove the #15 Johnny Lightning PJ Colt-Ford. In the race Leonard qualified in 18th place and was soon running in 2nd place to teammate Unser. Leonard's engine quit after 73 laps and he could only finish in 24th place. It was discovered post-race the engine switch had been flipped, meaning that there was nothing wrong with the engine and that Leonard could have continued. Leonard then competed in the Rex Mays Classic at Wisconsin State Fairgrounds Park Speedway where he only led the final nine laps on his way to his first victory since 1965 at Milwaukee. Leonard started one more race that year, the California 500 at Ontario Motor Speedway, where he qualified in 6th place and finished in 13th place after spinning out. Leonard finished the season 32nd in points.

Championship years
In 1971, Leonard became a full-time driver at Vel's Parnelli Jones. When the season started, Leonard had no sponsor on his #15 Vel's Parnelli Jones Racing PJ Colt-Ford for the season-opening pair of races, the Rafaela Indy 300 at Autódromo Ciudad de Rafaela. At the Phoenix 150 at Phoenix International Raceway, the car was sponsored by Johnny Lightning, the same sponsor of teammate Al Unser. In the first three races of the season, Leonard was a model of consistency with finishes of 6th, 3rd and 4th. Starting with the Trenton 200 at Trenton International Speedway, the car got sponsorship from Samsonite.

At the Indianapolis 500, Leonard battled with teammate Unser for the lead. Leonard eventually led for 21 laps before retiring with a broken turbocharger. Leonard then got back-to-back second-place finishes at the Rex Mays Classic 150 at Wisconsin State Fairgrounds Park Speedway and the Schaefer 500 at Pocono International Raceway; in the latter Leonard battled with Mark Donohue for the win, until Leonard stretched his fuel hose during his final pit stop. Leonard won the California 500 at Ontario Motor Speedway. Leonard clinched the championship at the next to last race of the season, the Trenton 300 at Trenton International Speedway, with a third-place finish.

In 1972, Leonard became part of a Super Team at Vel's Parnelli Jones with Unser and Mario Andretti. He originally drove the #1 Samsonite PJ Colt-Offenhauser at the season-opening Jimmy Bryan 150 at Phoenix International Raceway. Starting with the Trentonian 200 at Trenton International Speedway, Leonard drove a Parnelli VPJ-1-Offenhauser. The car was originally equipped with dihedral wings on the front. These were eventually scrapped by the time of the Indianapolis 500. The team was then struggling to remain competitive with the new designs from All American Racers and Team McLaren. The team then got the car set up right for all three and Leonard qualified in 6th place and finished in third place. He had a three-race winning streak at the Michigan 200 at Michigan International Speedway, the Schaefer 500 at Pocono International Raceway and the Tony Bettenhausen 200 at Wisconsin State Fairgrounds Park Speedway. Leonard clinched his second consecutive championship at the California 500 at Ontario Motor Speedway.

Downturn
In 1973, Leonard returned to Vel's Parnelli Jones, driving the #1 Samsonite Parnelli VPJ-2-Offenhauser. The season was a struggle for Leonard as he could only get a best finish of 5th place at the season-opening Texas 200 at Texas World Speedway and the second heat of the Trentonian 300 at Trenton International Speedway. At the Indianapolis 500, Leonard struggled to qualify after teammates Andretti and Unser qualified 6th and 8th. He eventually qualified in 29th place and finish in 18th place due to a broken hub. Leonard finished the season 15th in points.

Injury and attempted comeback
By 1974, Vel's Parnelli Jones was in trouble. Of their three cars from 1973 only Andretti in 5th place would make the top 10. They lost their Samsonite sponsorship at year's end and Firestone (Vel's Parnelli Jones tire supplier since their debut in the 1967 USAC Championship Car season) was cutting back their racing funding as well, eventually pulling out completely at the end of the year. Leonard drove the #16 Vel's Parnelli Ford Eagle-Offenhauser. At the season-opening heat races that made up the California 500 Qualification Races at Ontario Motor Speedway he finished in 4th place.

A week later in the main race, after completing 146 laps, his tire blew on the main stretch heading into turn one, causing him to drift high off the groove and crash heavily into the outside wall. He suffered a gash in his forehead and extensive injuries to his feet and legs. Since Leonard's injuries occurred before the orthopedic reconstruction methods pioneered by motorsports physician Dr. Terry Trammell, he was left severely debilitated. He finished 30th in points. A year later in 1975, Leonard attempted to make a comeback at the California 500 at Ontario Motor Speedway for Gilmore Racing in the #10 Gilmore Racing Coyote-Foyt. He ended up failing USAC's physical, ending his career.

NASCAR career

In 1969, after signing with Smokey Yunick for the Indianapolis 500, Leonard drove the #13 Smokey Yunick Ford Torino Talladega at the Medal of Honor Firecracker 400 at Daytona International Speedway. Leonard crashed out after 47 laps and finish in 31st place after starting in 12th place. Due to racing with a USAC license he was unable to score points in the NASCAR Grand National Series, going unranked (a rule that no longer exists).

After racing
In 1991, he was inducted into the Motorsports Hall of Fame of America in the Motorcycles category. In 1998, he was inducted into the A.M.A. Motorcycle Hall of Fame.  In 2001, he was inducted into the San Jose Sports Hall of Fame.

Complete USAC Championship Car results

Indianapolis 500 results

References

External links
 Joe Leonard at The Greatest 33
 Joe Leonard: Champion on Two Wheels and Four - Motorcyclist, 8 February 2011
 'it's A Wonderful Wild Thing' - Sports Illustrated, 27 May 1968
 Rude Setback For The Jet Age - Sports Illustrated, 10 June 1968
 Hoist A Bottle To Leadfoot U. - Sports Illustrated, 20 September 1971
 You Know Me, Al,' Said Joe - Sports Illustrated, 7 August 1972
 Joe Leonard at Racing Reference
 Joe Leonard at Driver Database

1932 births
2017 deaths
Motorcycle racers from San Diego
American motorcycle racers
AMA Grand National Championship riders
American racing drivers
Champ Car champions
Champ Car drivers
Indianapolis 500 drivers
Indianapolis 500 polesitters
Racing drivers from San Diego
USAC Stock Car drivers
San Diego High School alumni